The North Eastern Alberta Junior B Hockey League is a Junior "B" ice hockey league in Alberta and Saskatchewan, Canada, sanctioned by Hockey Canada

League champions advance to the Hockey Alberta Provincials to face off against the winners of the other Alberta "B" leagues in the Russ Barnes Trophy. The Provincial winner earns the chance to compete for the Western Canadian Junior "B" championship, the Keystone Cup.

Teams

Champions

Former teams
 Frog Lake T-Birds (2014-2019)
 Lac La Biche Clippers (1995-2000) returned 2017
 Onion Lake Border Chiefs (2014-2018)
 Saddle Lake Warriors (1991-2017)
 Thorhild Titans (2009-2012)

NHL alumni
Shane Doan
Kyle Freadrich
Rich Healey
Shawn Heins
Gordon Mark
Glen Sather
Brent Severyn
Lance Ward
Jeff Woywitka
Miles Zaharko
Wade Redden

See also
 List of ice hockey teams in Alberta

References

External links
North Eastern Alberta Junior B Hockey League

Ice hockey leagues in Alberta
B
Sports leagues established in 1990
1990 establishments in Alberta